Stadion FK Řezuz Děčín is a football stadium in Děčín, Czech Republic. It is the home stadium of FK Řezuz Děčín.

External links
 Photo gallery and data at Erlebnis-stadion.de

Football venues in the Czech Republic
Sport in Děčín